Shrimat Samyamindra Thirtha Swami  (born 12 September 1982), also referred to as Shri Samyamindra Thirtha Swamiji, became the  head (Mathadipathi) of the Kashi Math on 24 January 2016. He is the 21st successive person called the swamiji of guru parampara.

Ritual education
The Sudha Mangalotsava of Samyamindra Tirtha was celebrated at Bangalore Shri Kashi Math Samsthan on Madhwa Navami day on 24 January 2010. The ceremony marks the end of a period of training in the tenets of the organisation.

Head of Kashi Math
Shrimath Sudhindra Thirtha Swamiji, the predecessor of Shrimath Samyamindra Thirtha Swamiji as mathadipathi, attained moksha on 17 January 2016. In accordance with the guru–shishya tradition followed by the math, he had previously initiated Samyamindra as the  shishya who would succeed him upon his death and thus Samyamindra became the new mathadipathi. He officially took charge on 28 January 2016 at Vyasashram, Haridwar.

List of Chathurmasya Vruthas Observed 
The following are the Chathurmasya Vruthas which are observed by Shri Samyamindra Thirtha Swamiji.

References

1982 births
Living people
Indian Hindus
People from Kerala